Danielle Renée Deckard (born November 21, 1989) is an American singer/songwriter residing in Sydney, Australia.

Danielle's debut album Happy was released independently in July 2018.

Danielle was the winner of the Unsigned Only Songwriting Competition’s ‘folk/singer-songwriter’ category in 2014 with her song ‘I Lied’. She was the recipient of the 2011 ASCAP Bart Howard Songwriting Scholarship. Danielle's music was used in the CNN documentary "Selling The Girl Next Door".

Biography 
Danielle was born in Vineland, New Jersey. She is one of four children of David Deckard Snr., a construction foreman for Madison Concrete Construction of Philadelphia, Pennsylvania, and Denise Deckard, a paediatric nurse. She attended Vineland High School and Berklee College of Music.

Discography
End Of The World (2015)
Dancing In The Dark (2017)
Happy (2018)

References

1989 births
Living people
American women singer-songwriters
Berklee College of Music alumni
Singer-songwriters from New Jersey
People from Vineland, New Jersey
21st-century American singers
21st-century American women singers